Vysyaraju Kasi Viswanadham Raju was an Indian politician from Odisha.

Life
Raju was a member of the first Orissa Legislative Assembly which met from 1937 to 1945. He was one of the members from Berhampur. He was a member of the opposition.

References

Members of the Odisha Legislative Assembly
Odisha MLAs 1937–1945
People from Ganjam district
Year of birth missing
Year of death missing
Place of birth missing